Bazeh-ye Asheqan (also Romanized as Bāzeh-ye ‘Āsheqān and Bāzeh ‘Āsheqān; also known as Basqū, ‘Āsheqān, Bāshekūn, Bāsheqūn, and Bāshqūn) is a village in Roshtkhar Rural District, in the Central District of Roshtkhar County, Razavi Khorasan Province, Iran. At the 2006 census, its population was 369, in 82 families.

See also 

 List of cities, towns and villages in Razavi Khorasan Province

References 

Populated places in Roshtkhar County